The Alekseyev I-212 was a twin-engined, jet fighter designed in the USSR in 1947 at OKB-21 (OKB - experimental design bureau). It was a two-seat variant of the I-21 (Istrebitel - Fighter) designed in response to a requirement for a very long-range fighter issued by the Voenno-Vozdushnye Sily (VVS), (Soviet Air Forces), in 1946. Intended as an escort fighter, it was also designed for use as a night fighter and reconnaissance aircraft. No prototype was built, although some parts may have begun building before the project was completed.

Development
After working as Lavochkin's right-hand man during World War II, Semyon Alekseyev was appointed as Chief Designer of OKB-21 at Gor'kiy in 1946. The Council of the People's Commissars directed Alekseyev, among others, to develop jet fighters using more powerful engines than the captured German examples and Soviet-built copies. The OKB responded with the I-21, which was planned to be built in several variants.

Development of the I-212, one such variant, began in 1947 as a twin-engined, all-metal, two-seat jet fighter. The round, streamlined fuselage was optimized to reduce drag and house the considerable amount of equipment and fuel required by the VVS. It had mid-mounted straight laminar flow wings and the engine nacelles were mounted in the middle of the wing, with the wing spars continued by banjo rings around the engines. The cruciform tail unit was swept at 45°. To save weight, the main load-bearing structures of the airframe were constructed from V-95 aluminum alloy and high-strength steel. Elektron (a magnesium alloy) was used for many components and castings. The aircraft used a tricycle undercarriage with the main wheels retracting into the fuselage. Hydraulically actuated air brakes were fitted either side of the rear fuselage.

The pilot and gunner/radio operator sat in tandem, back to back in a single pressurized cockpit, protected by armour plates to their front and rear, as well as by a bulletproof windscreen, seated on ejection seats. The aircraft was intended to use Klimov VK-1 engines, a derivative of the Rolls-Royce Nene II, but the engine was still under development, so less powerful Kuznetsov RD-45s were substituted instead. The aircraft carried a Toryii-1 radar for use by the gunner/radio operator.

The primary armament was to have been four  Nudel'man Suranov NS-23 autocannon mounted in the nose, each with 150 rounds per gun (rpg), and a remote controlled tail barbette, armed with a pair of  Berezin B-20 autocannon also equipped with 150 rpg. The design team considered several variations, the first of which was two Nudel'man Suranov NS-23s with 150 rpg and a  Nudel'man Suranov NS-45 autocannon with 45 rounds in the nose of the aircraft and a pair of NS-23 in the tail barbette. The second alternative consisted of two  Nudel'man Suranov NS-37 and a  Nudel'man Suranov NS-57 autocannon in the nose. A single hardpoint under each wing could carry a single  bomb or a drop tank carrying  of fuel.

Despite reports that a prototype began taxiing tests on 30 June 1948, it is now clear that no prototype was actually built and that only manufacturing of the tailplane may have begun.

Variants
I-212: Initial version, never built.
I-213: Proposed heavier version with more fuel and only two forward-facing NS-23s and a single NS-23 in the tail barbette.
I-214: Proposed version with the tail barbette replaced with a rearwards-facing radar and heavier forward-facing armament.
UTI-212: Proposed training variant of the I-212 with both crewmen facing forward.

Specifications (I-212 (estimated))

See also

References

Citations

Bibliography
 Gordon, Yefim & Kommissarov, Dmitry. Early Soviet Jet Fighters. Manchester, UK: Hikoki Publications, 2014. .
 Gunston, Bill. The Osprey Encyclopedia of Russian Aircraft 1875–1995. London: Osprey, 1995. .

Alekseyev aircraft
1940s Soviet fighter aircraft
Abandoned military aircraft projects of the Soviet Union